Sheth Gokuldas Tejpal or Sheth Goculdas Tejpal (1822–1867) was a merchant, businessman, social reformer and philanthropist from Mumbai, India. Gokuldas, who hailed from Gujarati Bhatia community, was well known for building charity institutions, hospitals, schools, hostels including famous Gokuldas Tejpal Hospital Gokuldas Tejpal Sanskrit College, where the first session of Indian National Congress was held On 28 December 1885. He also built the Gokuldas Tejpal Anglo-vernacular high school and Gokuldas Tejpal Boarding House.

Life 
In 1822, Gokuldas was born in Bhatia community. His father and his uncle began life at early age as hawkers in Bombay. His father, Tejpal, passed his fortune to Gokuldas in 1833 when he died. His uncle too left his own fortune to Gokuldas when he died. Gokuldas died in 1867 by leaving large amounts of money for charitable institutions, including a boarding school and several other schools.

See also 
 Bhau Daji
 Gokuldas Tejpal Hospital
 Karsandas Mulji
 Maharaj Libel Case
 Narmad

References 

1822 births
1867 deaths
Gujarati people
Gujaratis from Mumbai
19th-century Indian philanthropists